Lukáš Dlouhý and Pavel Vízner were the defending champions, but did not participate this year.

Marcelo Melo and André Sá won in the final 3–6, 6–2, [10–6], against Martín García and Sebastián Prieto.

Seeds

Draw

Draw

External links
Draw

Doubles